John Smith Poole (1892–1967) was an English footballer who played for Sunderland and Bradford City, who later became a trainer of the latter. He was born in Codnor. After retiring from playing he had a lengthy spell as manager of Mansfield Town.

Career
Poole played for Sutton United (Notts) and Sutton Junction before signing for Nottingham Forest, but he failed to break into their first team. With the outbreak of World War I he began appearing as a guest player for Sheffield United. After the war he signed for Sunderland where he made his Football League début before finishing his playing career at Bradford City.

Managerial career
After retiring from playing he became coach at Bradford before becoming manager of Mansfield Town.

References

1892 births
1967 deaths
People from Codnor
Footballers from Derbyshire
English footballers
Sutton Junction F.C. players
Nottingham Forest F.C. players
Sunderland A.F.C. players
Bradford City A.F.C. players
English Football League players
Sheffield United F.C. wartime guest players
English football managers
Mansfield Town F.C. managers
Bradford City A.F.C. non-playing staff
Association football defenders